Chris Kuzneski (born 1969) is an American novelist. His eleventh novel, The Prisoner's Gold, won the Thriller Award for the 2016 Book of the Year at a gala hosted by the International Thriller Writers (ITW) in New York City on July 9, 2016. His works have also been honored by the Florida Book Awards and named a Literary Guild's featured selection.

Biographical sketch
Born in Indiana, Pennsylvania, Kuzneski currently lives in Tampa, Florida. In the fourth grade, he wrote The Monster Cookbook, which so impressed the librarian that it was bound and placed in the school library. He played football at the University of Pittsburgh where he received his undergraduate degree in writing and his master's degree in teaching. While studying at Pitt, he wrote for The Pitt News, the Indiana Gazette, and the Pittsburgh Post-Gazette. From 1992 until 1998, he taught English and coached football in two western Pennsylvania school districts and was selected to Who's Who Among America's Teachers. However, he knew he wanted to be an author, so he left teaching and started working on his first novel, The Plantation.

Bibliography

Payne & Jones series
 The Plantation (2000)
 Sign of the Cross (2006)
 Sword of God (2007)
 The Lost Throne (2008)
 The Prophecy (2009)
 The Secret Crown (2010)
 The Death Relic (2011)
 The Einstein Pursuit (2013)
The Malta Escape (2018)

The Hunters series
 The Hunters (2013)
 The Forbidden Tomb (2014)
 The Prisoner's Gold (2015)

The Hunters: Origins series
 Before the Storm (2016)

References

External links
Chris Kuzneski's Official Site

1969 births
Living people
American thriller writers
Novelists from Florida
Writers from Pittsburgh
People from Indiana, Pennsylvania
Players of American football from Pennsylvania
Pittsburgh Panthers football players
University of Pittsburgh alumni
Military humor
American male novelists
21st-century American novelists
21st-century American male writers
Novelists from Pennsylvania